Loehr is a surname of German origin. Notable people with the surname include:

Al Loehr (1927–2013), American politician
Arnold William Loehr (1886–1963), American-born Canadian farmer and politician
Bret Loehr (born 1993), American actor
Dolores Loehr ( Diana Lynn; 1926–1971), American actor and pianist
Gustave Loehr (1864–1918), American civic leader, co-founder of Rotary International
Max Loehr (1903–1988), American art historian, author, and professor of Chinese art
Pearl Grace Loehr (1882–1944), American photographer and arts educator
Peter Loehr (born 1967), China-based American film producer, writer, and actor
Peter Loehr (politician) (1831–1899), Prussian German-born American politician
Rodney Loehr (1907–2005), American historian, university professor, book reviewer, television host, and soldier
Stephen Yale-Loehr (born 1954), American law professor and immigration law attorney

See also
Löhr (surname)
Lohr (surname)

References

Surnames of German origin